Richard Msowoya is a Malawian politician who served as Speaker of the National Assembly of Malawi from 2014 to 2019.

Msowoya served as Deputy Minister of Education in Bingu wa Mutharika's cabinet but he resigned following the introduction of the controversial 'equitable' selection of students into Malawian public higher education institutions, dubbed, 'the quota' system which, presumably, disenfranchises capable students from more populous and intellectually more gifted districts.

He was elected as a member of the National Assembly on 20 May 2014, and on 16 June 2014 he was elected as Speaker of the National Assembly, receiving 101 votes against 89 for Francis Kasaila. He was also the running mate of Lazarus Chakwera, the Malawi Congress Party's presidential candidate in the May 2014 general elections.

In July 2018, Msowoya  announced that he had joined the then newly formed  United Transformation Movement (UTM). During the 2019 Presidential and parliamentary elections , Msowoya decided not to contest in his Karonga Nyungwe constituency. Her daughter, Dr Luwani Msowoya became the UTM candidate for the area but went on to lose the seat to Independent Candidate Kenneth Ndovie

References

Malawi Congress Party politicians
Members of the National Assembly (Malawi)
Speakers of the National Assembly (Malawi)